Lady Godiva is an 1897 painting by English artist John Collier, who worked in the style of the Pre-Raphaelite Brotherhood. The portrayal of Lady Godiva and her well-known but apocryphal ride through Coventry, England, is held in Coventry's Herbert Art Gallery and Museum.

Lady Godiva was bequeathed by social reformer Thomas Hancock Nunn. When he died in 1937, the painting was offered to the Corporation of Hampstead. He specified in his will that should his bequest be refused by Hampstead, the painting was then to be offered to Coventry. The model in the painting is Mab (Mabel) Paul, an artist model and West End theatre actress who was also painted as herself by John Collier.

References

1898 paintings
Horses in art
Lady Godiva
Paintings in the West Midlands
Paintings by John Collier